"Wrap Your Arms Around Me" is the second single from former ABBA star Agnetha Fältskog's solo album of the same name.

Release
The single featured an edit of the album version which was also included on the 12" single released exclusively in the UK.

The single's B-side was a Tomas Ledin composition, "Take Good Care Of Your Children".

In 2009, the song was remixed as a nine-minute edit by Belgian dance music producer Villa.

Reception
"Wrap Your Arms Around Me" was Fältskog's second solo single after "The Heat Is On", and reached No. 1 in Belgium. The song was also a Top 5 hit in the Netherlands and South Africa. It was the most successful single from the album in Ireland, improving on the No. 28 position of "The Heat Is On" by reaching No. 15. By contrast, the song failed to reach the UK Singles Chart Top 40 (peaking at No. 44).

Cover versions
Bonnie St. Claire performed the Dutch version, "Sla je arm om me heen" in 1983.

Sylvie Vartan performed the French version, "Des heures de désir" in 1984.  She also recorded an English language cover version on the album "Made In USA" (released in Japan as "Double Exposure") in 1985.

Britta Phillips covered the song on her debut album, Luck Or Magic (2016).

Charts

Weekly charts

Year-end charts

References

1983 singles
Agnetha Fältskog songs
Song recordings produced by Mike Chapman
Songs written by Mike Chapman
Songs written by Holly Knight
Ultratop 50 Singles (Flanders) number-one singles
1983 songs
Polar Music singles